Capt. James Callaway (1783–1815), grandson of Daniel Boone.  He is the namesake of Callaway County, Missouri.

Birth and early life
James Callaway, was born in Kentucky September 13, 1783 to Flanders Callaway and Jemima Boone, Daniel Boone's daughter. In 1798 his family moved to Missouri. He returned to Kentucky in 1799 to complete his education. In 1805 he married the former Nancy Howell, and the couple settled in Howell's prairie, in St. Charles County, where he built a home. He was involved in the fur trade and local business. He was a deputy sheriff in St. Charles County for several years.

Military service and death
Callaway was appointed Cornet of a troop of Missouri Rangers in 1808. He was promoted to Captain in 1812, and the following year raised a company, for either the ongoing conflicts with indigenous people or the War of 1812 (accounts differ.) He participated in the expedition of General Howard in 1813 and the Battle of Credit Island in 1814 in a military capacity. Callaway was killed in battle with Native Americans near Loutre Creek in March 1815. He was buried by his father where he had been killed in what is now Montgomery County, Missouri.

References

External links
 Captain James Callaway biography from History of Callaway County Missouri, 1884, page 94 - 98 on the Callaway County official website
 Callaway Family Association

1783 births
1815 deaths
People from Kentucky
American military personnel killed in the American Indian Wars